The Gary Works is a major steel mill in Gary, Indiana, on the shore of Lake Michigan. For many years, the Gary Works was the world's largest steel mill, and it remains the largest integrated mill in North America. It is operated by the United States Steel Corporation. By February 26, 2023, U.S. Steel will lay off 244 workers reducing from 2500 to 2256 Employees.

The Gary Works includes both steelmaking and finishing facilities as an integrated mill, and has an annual capacity of 8.2 million tons. It contains:

 Four blast furnaces
 Three top-blown basic oxygen process (BOP) vessels 
 Three bottom-blown BOP (Q-BOP) vessels
 Vacuum degasser
 Three ladle metallurgy facilities
 Four continuous slab casters
 An 84" hot strip mill
 Hot-rolled temper mill
 Both 80" and 84" pickle lines
 A 52" six-stand and an 80" five-stand cold-reduction mills
 Electrolytic cleaning line
 Three batch annealing facilities
 A 38" continuous annealing line
 An 80" one-stand, a 48" two-stand, and an 84" two-stand temper mills
 A 48" two-stand double cold-reduction mill
 A 37" and a 46" electrolytic tinning lines
Pig Iron Caster

The Gary Works was under construction from 1906 to 1908, and the first shipment of iron ore was unloaded on June 23, 1908. About  of sand were moved in the process of constructing the plant.

The Gary Works remains Gary's largest single employer and a key element of the city's tax base, but employment levels have fallen substantially since the mid-20th century; the plant and allied facilities employed over 30,000 people in the early 1970s, but only 6,000 in 1990, 5,000 in 2015, 2,500 in 2021, and 2,246 in 2023. The plant is also a central part of the city's geography; its main entrance is at the northern end of Broadway, the city's main thoroughfare.

References

Further reading

External links

Economy of Gary, Indiana
Ironworks and steel mills in the United States
Industrial buildings and structures in Indiana
U.S. Steel